Fabio Gallo (born 11 September 1970) is an Italian football coach and former player who played as a midfielder. He was most recently head coach of Serie C club Foggia.

Playing career 
Between 1988 and 2007, Gallo played for Inter, Oltrepò Calcio, Spezia, Alessandria, Brescia, Atalanta, Ternana, Como, Treviso, Torino and Novara Calcio.

Coaching career 
Gallo started is coaching career as Atalanta's youth team coach.

In the 2012–13 season he was appointed head coach of Giacomense in Lega Pro Seconda Divisione until 4 December 2012 when he was sacked after a heavy 7–0 defeat against Renate.

On 14 February 2019, Gallo was appointed as the manager of Ternana. His contract expired at the end of the 2019–20 season and was not extended.

On 5 February 2021, he was appointed new head coach of Serie C club Potenza, replacing Ezio Capuano. After escaping relegation by the end of the season, he was confirmed for the following 2021–22 Serie C campaign, but was dismissed on 21 October 2021 following a dismal start in the new season.

In June 2022, Gallo joined Gianni De Biasi's Azerbaijan national football team coaching staff as an assistant. On 4 October 2022, he was hired by Serie C club Foggia as their new manager, signing a contract until the end of the season. He resigned on 22 February 2023, due to disagreements with the board.

Honours

Player 
Brescia
 Anglo-Italian Cup: 1993–94

Treviso
 Supercoppa di Lega Serie C1: 2002–03

References

External links 
 Profile from Gazzetta dello Sport

1970 births
Living people
People from Bollate
Italian footballers
Italian football managers
Brescia Calcio players
Atalanta B.C. players
Ternana Calcio players
Como 1907 players
Treviso F.B.C. 1993 players
Torino F.C. players
Association football midfielders
Serie A players
Serie B players
Serie C players
Novara F.C. players
Spezia Calcio players
U.S. Alessandria Calcio 1912 players
Inter Milan players
Italy youth international footballers
Serie B managers
Spezia Calcio managers
Ternana Calcio managers
Calcio Foggia 1920 managers
Serie C managers
Footballers from Lombardy
Sportspeople from the Metropolitan City of Milan